Eucalyptus decurva, commonly known as the slender mallee, is a species of mallee that is endemic to the south-west of Western Australia. It has smooth whitish bark, lance-shaped to curved adult leaves, pendulous flower buds arranged in groups of seven, white flowers and pendulous, more or less spherical fruit.

Description
The bark is smooth, white-gray, salmon to yellow-green and sometimes powdery. Flowering occurs between April to October and the flowers are white to pale pink.

Taxonomy and naming
Eucalyptus decurva was first formally described in 1863 by Ferdinand von Mueller from a specimen collected by George Maxwell near the Porongurups and the description was published in Fragmenta phytographiae Australiae.<ref name="F.Muell.">{{cite book |last1=von Mueller |first1=Ferdinand |title=Fragmenta phytographiae Australiae (Volume 3) |date=1863 |publisher=Victorian Government Printer |location=Melbourne |pages=130–131 |url=https://www.biodiversitylibrary.org/item/7220#page/138/mode/1up |access-date=27 May 2019}}</ref> The specific epithet (decurva'') is a Latin word meaning "down-curved", referring to the flower buds.

Distribution and habitat
Slender mallee grows in sandy and lateritic soils in hilly coastal and near-coastal areas, mostly between the Stirling Range and Esperance but with disjunct populations near Perth.

See also
List of Eucalyptus species

References

Eucalypts of Western Australia
decurva
Myrtales of Australia
Plants described in 1863
Taxa named by Ferdinand von Mueller
Mallees (habit)